Jaspreet Singh (born 9 June 1993) is an Italian cricketer who plays for the national team. In May 2019, he was named in Italy's squad for the Regional Finals of the 2018–19 ICC T20 World Cup Europe Qualifier tournament in Guernsey. He made his Twenty20 International (T20I) debut for Italy, against Norway, on 15 June 2019.

In November 2019, he was named in Italy's squad for the Cricket World Cup Challenge League B tournament in Oman. He made his List A debut, for Italy against Bermuda, on 12 December 2019. In September 2021, he was named in Italy's T20I squad for the Regional Final of the 2021 ICC Men's T20 World Cup Europe Qualifier tournament.

References

External links
 

1993 births
Living people
Italian cricketers
Italy Twenty20 International cricketers
Place of birth missing (living people)